Genia Berger (1907–2000) was an Israeli artist, born in the Russian Empire.

Biography 
Genia Berger was born in Kharkov in 1907 to a traditional and Zionist family. In 1925 she moved to Germany, where she studied art. In 1926 she immigrated to Palestine and began to simultaneously study architecture at the Technion Montefiore and painting in Yitchak Frankel's studio in Tel Aviv. In the end of 1929, she returned to Berlin, where she began to study painting and set design at the Academy of Fine Arts. In 1933, she returned to Palestine and began to make a living by designing stage sets. From 1935 to 1937 she resided in Paris, France. In 1953 she became one of the founders of the artists' village of Ein Hod in Northern Israel.

Berger's early work, influenced by French art, was in the post-impressionist painting style. Nonetheless, between the ages of 40 and 60, she focused mainly on theater set design for theater and the opera theater in Israel. Her designs were influenced considerably by Russian Modernist decorative art. Her works include set design for "The King Solomon and the Cobbler" (Ohel Theater, 1943), "Bar Kokhba" (Ohel Theater, 1945), "Khovanshchina" (Israel National Opera, 1952), "Kazmirov Brothers" (Habima, 1956) and more. In the 1950s, Berger returned to painting and began sculpting and creating ceramic reliefs. Her works are characterized by a decorative aspect.

Gallery

Education 
 Sculpture under Leonardo Bloch, Cracow, Russian Empire.
 1925 Painting, State Academy of Fine Arts, Berlin
 1926 Architecture, Montefiore Technion, Tel Aviv
 1926 Painting with Yitzhak Frenkel, Tel Aviv
 1930–1933 State Academy of Fine Arts, Berlin, under Willi Jaekel and Karl Hofer
 1935–1937 Post-graduate studies, Académie de la Grande Chaumière, Paris, France

Awards and recognition
 1986 General Workers' Union Prize, Israel
 The Golomb House Award, The Artists' Village, Ein Hod
 1971 Ministry of Education, Culture and Sport
 1984 Association of Designers in Israel

See also
 Visual arts in Israel
 Yehuda Gabai, "Her Grandmother Babushka", Tel Aviv 1996, Hebrew
 A.D. Shafir, "Theater Works, a collection of works by Genia Berger", Shafir Publishing House, 1994, Hebrew

References

Berger, Genia. Genia Berger. Tel Aviv: United Artists Ltd., 1977
Art Gallery 31. Genia Berger: Paintings 1994–1999. Tel Aviv: Art Gallery 31, 1999
Zach, Natan, ed. Genia Berger – Ceramic Sculpture. Tel Aviv: Graphica Omanim, 1998
Zach, Natan, ed. Genia Berger – Works for the Theatre. Tel Aviv: Genia Berger, 1994

External links 
 
 Genia Berger – The Ein Hod Artist Site
 Israel Zafrir Photographer Archive, The Information Center for Israeli Art, The Israel Museum: Genia Berger
 

1907 births
2000 deaths
20th-century Israeli women artists
20th-century Israeli painters
Israeli ceramists
Israeli women painters
20th-century ceramists
Israeli women ceramists
Burials at Nahalat Yitzhak Cemetery
Soviet emigrants to Mandatory Palestine